Andalusia Township is located in Rock Island County, Illinois. As of the 2010 census, its population was 2,299 and it contained 920 housing units. Andalusia Township was formed from Edgington Township in September, 1858.

Geography

Demographics

References

External links
City-data.com
Illinois State Archives

Townships in Rock Island County, Illinois
Populated places established in 1858
1858 establishments in Illinois
Townships in Illinois